Kose-Uuemõisa is a small borough in Kose Parish, Harju County in northern Estonia.

Kose-Uuemõisa Manor
The village has been the location for a manor house since the 1340s, although the medieval building burned down in the Livonian War. The current building, in neo-Renaissance style, dates from the 1850s and was erected by the Baltic German family von Uexküll. In the park adjacent to the manor house the von Uexküll family burial chapel, built in 1905, still stands. It is built in artistically accomplished neo-Gothic style.

See also
 List of palaces and manor houses in Estonia

References

External links

Kose Parish 
Kose-Uuemõisa at Estonian Manors Portal

Boroughs and small boroughs in Estonia
Manor houses in Estonia
Kreis Harrien